The "Manifesto of the Ninety-Three" (originally "To the Civilized World" by "Professors of Germany") is a 4 October 1914 proclamation by 93 prominent Germans supporting Germany in the start of World War I. The Manifesto galvanized support for the war throughout German schools and universities, but many foreign intellectuals were outraged. For instance, some military actions by Germany were called elsewhere the Rape of Belgium.

The astronomer Wilhelm Julius Foerster soon repented having signed the document. Soon, with the physiologist Georg Friedrich Nicolai, drew up the Manifesto to the Europeans. They argued,
 

Whilst various people expressed sympathy with these sentiments, only the philosopher Otto Buek and Albert Einstein signed it and it remained unpublished at the time. It was subsequently brought to light by Einstein.

A report in 1921 in The New York Times found that of 76 surviving signatories, 60 expressed varying degrees of regret. Some claimed not to have seen what they had signed.

Purpose and reaction 
The manifesto was primarily designed to contradict the negative image of Germany being portrayed in the press by other countries (especially in Britain), which is indicated by the fact that it was published in ten different languages. In addition, the manifesto articulated moral indignation, laid charges against foreign governments, academic institutions, and scholars whom the authors believed had wronged the German nation. They also probably hoped to undermine support for the war among the civilian population of the Entente powers by demonstrating that German scientists — who at the time were very highly reputed — were fully in support of their country, thereby inducing the intellectuals of other European nations to put pressure on the governments of their respective countries. The reaction of both the European and American press and of academic institutions around the world indicate that this attempt was a failure.

Text
Here is an English translation (italics in original):

Signatories

The 93 signatories included Nobel Prize laureates, artists, physicians, physicists, chemists, theologians, philosophers, poets, architects and known college teachers. The German composer Richard Strauss refused to sign, on the basis that "Declarations about war and politics are not fitting for an artist."

List of signatories

Adolf von Baeyer, chemist: synthesized indigo, 1905 recipient of the Nobel Prize in Chemistry
Peter Behrens, architect and designer
Emil Adolf von Behring, physiologist: received the 1901 Nobel Prize in Physiology of Medicine
Wilhelm von Bode, art historian and curator
Aloïs Brandl, Austrian-German philologist
Lujo Brentano, economist and social reformer
Justus Brinckmann, art historian
Johannes Conrad, political economist
Franz von Defregger, Austrian artist
Richard Dehmel, anti-conservative poet and writer
Adolf Deissmann, Protestant theologian
Wilhelm Dörpfeld, architect and archeologist (including site of ancient Troy)
Friedrich von Duhn, classical archaeologist
Paul Ehrlich, awarded the 1908 Nobel Prize in Physiology or Medicine, initiated chemotherapy, "the magic bullet" 
Albert Ehrhard, Catholic priest and church historian
Karl Engler, chemist
Gerhard Esser, Catholic theologian
Rudolf Christoph Eucken, philosopher: winner of the 1908 Nobel Prize for Literature
Herbert Eulenberg, poet and playwright
Henrich Finke, Catholic church historian
Hermann Emil Fischer, chemist: 1902 recipient of the Nobel Prize in Chemistry
Wilhelm Foerster, also signed counter-manifesto
Ludwig Fulda, Jewish playwright with strong social commitment
Eduard von Gebhardt, painter
Jan Jakob Maria de Groot, Sinologist and historian of religion
Fritz Haber, chemist: received the 1918 Nobel Prize in Chemistry for synthesizing ammonia
Ernst Haeckel, biologist: coined the words "ecology, phylum, stem cell," developed "ontogeny recapitulates phylogeny"
Max Halbe, dramatist
Adolf von Harnack, Lutheran theologian
Carl Hauptmann, playwright
Gerhart Hauptmann, dramatist and novelist: received the 1912 Nobel Prize in Literature
Gustav Hellmann, meteorologist
Wilhelm Herrmann, Reformed theologian
Andreas Heusler, Swiss medievalist
Adolf von Hildebrand, sculptor
Ludwig Hoffmann, architect
Engelbert Humperdinck, composer: including "Hänsel und Gretel"
Leopold Graf von Kalckreuth, painter
Arthur Kampf, history painter
Friedrich August von Kaulbach, painter
Theodor Kipp, jurist
Felix Klein, mathematician: group theory, complex analysis, non-Euclidean geometry; "the Klein bottle"
Max Klinger, Symbolist painter, sculptor, printmaker, and writer
Aloïs Knoepfler, art historian
 Anton Koch, Catholic theologian
Paul Laband, professor of law
Karl Lamprecht, historian
Philipp Lenard, physicist: winner of the 1905 Nobel Prize for Physics for cathode rays research
Maximilian Lenz, painter
Max Liebermann, Jewish Impressionist painter and printmaker
Franz von Liszt, jurist and legal scholar (cousin of the composer)
Ludwig Manzel, sculptor
Joseph Mausbach, theologian
Georg von Mayr, statistician
Sebastian Merkle, Catholic theologian
Eduard Meyer, historian
Heinrich Morf, linguist
Friedrich Naumann, liberal politician and Protestant pastor
Albert Neisser, physician who discovered the cause of gonorrhea
Walther Hermann Nernst, chemist: third law of thermodynamics, won the 1920 Nobel Prize in chemistry
Wilhelm Ostwald, chemist: received the 1909 Nobel Prize in Chemistry 
Bruno Paul, architect, illustrator, interior designer, and furniture designer.
Max Planck, theoretical physicist: originated quantum theory, awarded the Nobel Prize in Physics in 1918
Albert Plohn, professor of medicine
Georg Reicke, author and politician
Max Reinhardt, Austrian-born, American stage and film actor and director
Alois Riehl, philosopher
Carl Robert, philologist and archeologist
Wilhelm Röntgen, physicist: known for X-rays, awarded 1901 Nobel Prize in Physics
Max Rubner, physiologist and hygienist
Fritz Schaper, sculptor
Adolf von Schlatter, Evangelical theologian 
August Schmidlin, theologian
Gustav von Schmoller, economist
Reinhold Seeberg, theologian
Martin Spahn, historian
Franz von Stuck, symbolist/Art Nouveau painter, sculptor, engraver, and architect
Hermann Sudermann, dramatist and novelist
Hans Thoma, painter
Wilhelm Trübner, realist painter
Karl Vollmöller, playwright and screenwriter
Richard Voss, dramatist and novelist
Karl Vossler, linguist and scholar
Siegfried Wagner, composer, son of Richard Wagner
Wilhelm Waldeyer, anatomist: named the chromosome
August von Wassermann, bacteriologist: developed the "Wassermann test" for syphilis
Felix Weingartner, Austrian conductor, composer and pianist
Theodor Wiegand, archeologist
Wilhelm Wien, physicist: received the 1911 Nobel Prize for work on heat radiation
Ulrich von Wilamowitz-Moellendorff, classical philologist
Richard Willstätter, organic chemist: won the 1915 Nobel Prize for Chemistry for structure of plant pigments
Wilhelm Windelband, philosopher
Wilhelm Wundt, physician, psychologist, physiologist, philosopher, "father of experimental psychology"

See also 

 Septemberprogramm

References

General references
 Herbert Gantschacher "Warpropaganda and the manifesto of the Ninety-Three" in Herbert Gantschacher "VIKTOR ULLMANN ZEUGE UND OPFER DER APOKALYPSE - WITNESS AND VICTIM OF THE APOCALYPSE - Testimone e vittima dell'Apocalisse - Prič in žrtev apokalipse - Svědek a oběť apokalypsy" - Complete original authorized edition in German and English language with summaries in Italian, Slovenian and Czech language, ARBOS-Edition , Arnoldstein-Klagenfurt-Salzburg-Vienna-Prora-Prague 2015, page 185.

External links 

 Original manifesto

Cultural history of World War I
German Empire in World War I
Political manifestos
World War I publications
1914 documents